Swords of the Iron Legion is an adventure module published in 1988 for the Dungeons & Dragons fantasy role-playing game.

Plot summary
Swords of the Iron Legion is a collection of 11 short Forgotten Realms adventure scenarios, including some designed for Battlesystem.

Publication history
I14 Swords of the Iron Legion was edited by Skip Williams, with a cover by Larry Elmore, and was published by TSR in 1988 as a 64-page book.

Reception

Reviews

References

Dungeons & Dragons modules
Role-playing game supplements introduced in 1988